Santa Luzia is a freguesia (parish) in the municipality of Tavira (Algarve, Portugal). The population in 2011 was 1,455, in an area of 8.50 km². It is considered the "capital do Polvo" or "capital of octopus" which is a local speciality.

References

Freguesias of Tavira
Towns in Portugal